T helper cell 22, also known as the Th22 cell, are a type of immune cell. Th22 are a derivative of naïve CD4+ T cells induced by the ligand activation of the transcription factor aryl hydrocarbon receptor (AhR), which uses environmental, metabolic, microbial, and dietary cues to control complex transcriptional programmes.  Th22 cell’s function is mediated by its ligand specific cytokine interleukin-22 (IL-22).

Differentiation and cytokine expression 

Th22 were distinguished as their own class of helper cells due to the stimulation and production of IL-22 independent of IFN- γ , IL-4, or IL-17 stimulation that are associated with Th1, Th2, and Th17 respectively. Th22 cell differentiation is stimulated by IL-6 and TNF-α, but others have found Th22 can be stimulated using Langerhans cells and dermal DCs. Th22 cells are known to secrete IL-22, IL-13, IL-26, TNF-α, and granzyme B.

In the immune response 

Th22 cells express the chemokine receptors CCR4, CCR6, and CCR10 which direct the cells to barrier surfaces such as the skin and tissue. Similarly, IL-22, the characteristic cytokine produced by Th22 cells has little effect on immune cells and instead acts on mucosal barriers. Due to mucosal barrier interactions Th22 and subsequently IL-22 play a significant role in a variety of skin diseases, intestinal diseases, autoimmune diseases, and allergy conditions. Many of these diseases are characterized by increased circulation of Th22 cells and concomitant increased IL-22 expression.

In psoriasis, there is a positive feedback loop between Th22 and IL-22 expression. Increased expression of IL-22 is observed during lesion formation that augments the expression of anti-microbials and induces chemokine ligand (CCL)-20 recruiting CCR6 , which is expressed on Th22 cells increasing their concentration in the lesion. Similarly, Th22 cells are found throughout the intestinal wall in irritable bowel diseases, facilitating IL-22 secretion and subsequent induction of tissue specific genes. Interestingly, Th22 cells induced expression of IL-22 in allergic asthma has been seen to have a protective effect against lung hypertension and tissue damage in murine models.

References 

T cells